Maugansville is a census-designated place (CDP) in Washington County, Maryland, United States. The population was 2,295 at the 2000 census.

Geography
Maugansville is located at  (39.693595, −77.745740).

Demographics

At the 2000 census there were 2,295 people, 912 households, and 667 families living in the CDP. The racial makeup of the CDP was 97.34% White, 0.52% African American, 0.22% Native American, 0.74% Asian, 0.39% from other races, and 0.78% from two or more races. Hispanic or Latino of any race were 1.05%.

Of the 912 households 31.4% had children under the age of 18 living with them, 61.2% were married couples living together, 9.4% had a female householder with no husband present, and 26.8% were non-families. 24.1% of households were one person and 11.3% were one person aged 65 or older. The average household size was 2.48 and the average family size was 2.93.

The age distribution was 23.9% under the age of 18, 7.6% from 18 to 24, 27.6% from 25 to 44, 24.5% from 45 to 64, and 16.4% 65 or older. The median age was 39 years. For every 100 females, there were 92.4 males. For every 100 females age 18 and over, there were 84.1 males.

The median household income was $45,391 and the median family income  was $51,875. Males had a median income of $34,286 versus $24,329 for females. The per capita income for the CDP was $20,907. About 2.9% of families and 6.7% of the population were below the poverty line, including 2.4% of those under age 18 and 13.5% of those age 65 or over.

References

Census-designated places in Washington County, Maryland
Census-designated places in Maryland